Mexican, You Can Do It is a 1985 Mexican drama film directed by José Estrada. It was entered into the 14th Moscow International Film Festival.

Cast
In alphabetical order
 Arturo Alegro
 Mario Casillas
 Isabela Corona
 Alma Delfina
 Roxana Frias
 Mario García González
 Sergio Jiménez
 Leonor Llausás
 Juan Ángel Martínez
 Antonio Miguel
 Ana Ofelia Murguía
 Rubén Rojo
 Carmen Salinas

References

External links
 

1985 films
1985 drama films
Mexican drama films
1980s Spanish-language films
1980s Mexican films